Asmir is a masculine given name. People named Asmir include:

 Asmir Avdukić, Bosnian footballer
 Asmir Begović, Bosnian footballer
 Asmir Ikanović, Bosnian footballer
 Asmir Kajević, Montenegrin football
 Asmir Kolašinac, Serbian shot putter
 Asmir Misini, Serbian footballer
 Asmir Suljić, Bosnian footballer

Bosnian masculine given names